This is a sortable list of compositions by Paul Juon, categorized by genre, opus number, date of composition (or publication) and title.

Juon's works are largely published by Robert Lienau, Verlag von F.E.C. Leuckart, Musikverlag Zimmermann, Hug Musikverlage and Carl Fischer Music

Sources
 International Juon Society: Catalogue of Works
 List of Works by Paul Juon at Musinfo, The Database of Swiss Music

Lists of compositions by composer
Lists of piano compositions by composer